Zdeněk Pavlíček (born 2 May 1952) is a Czech biathlete. He competed in the relay event at the 1976 Winter Olympics.

References

External links
 

1952 births
Living people
Czech male biathletes
Olympic biathletes of Czechoslovakia
Biathletes at the 1976 Winter Olympics
People from Zubří
Sportspeople from the Zlín Region